Tasman Heights is one of the suburbs of Nelson, New Zealand. It lies to the southeast of Nelson city centre, between Wakatu and Moana.

References

Suburbs of Nelson, New Zealand
Populated places in the Nelson Region